Recep Yıldız (born 10 March 1986) is a Turkish professional footballer who last played as a centre back for Körfez FK.

References

1986 births
Living people
Turkish footballers
Turkey under-21 international footballers
Stuttgarter Kickers players
Antalyaspor footballers
Adanaspor footballers
Association football defenders